North Carolina's 87th House district is one of 120 districts in the North Carolina House of Representatives. It has been represented by Republican Destin Hall since 2017.

Geography
Since 2023, the district has included all of Caldwell County, as well as part of Watauga County. The district overlaps with the 45th and 47th Senate districts.

District officeholders

Election results

2022

2020

2018

2016

2014

2012

2010

2008

2006

2004

2002

2000

References

North Carolina House districts
Caldwell County, North Carolina
Watauga County, North Carolina